Waldstein Castle is a ruined castle on an eminence near Franzosenhof in the Waldstein valley near the village of Fischerbach in Ortenaukreis in the south German state of Baden-Württemberg.

The hill castle was built by the lords of Waldstein, was mentioned in the records in 1353, but fell into ruins after 1500. Of the former castle site on a rock plateau of 40 by 10 metres, only a few sections of the ruined walls remain.

See also 
 List of castles in Baden-Württemberg

Sources 
 Klein, Kurt (1997). Burgen, Schlösser und Ruinen. Zeugen der Vergangenheit im Ortenaukreis. Reiff Schwarzwaldverlag. Offenburg.

External links 
 Waldstein Castle at burgeninventar.de 

Ruined castles in Germany